Casierius is an extinct genus of prehistoric bony fish that lived during the Albian stage of the Early Cretaceous epoch. It is one of the oldest eels. The fossils of this animal were found in  Glen Rose Formation near, Hood County, Texas.

See also

 Prehistoric fish
 List of prehistoric bony fish

References

Prehistoric bony fish genera
Cretaceous bony fish
Early Cretaceous fish of North America